Kathrin Klamroth (born 1968) is a German mathematician and computer scientist whose research topics include combinatorial optimization and facility location. She is a professor in the department of mathematics and computer science at the University of Wuppertal.

Education and career
Klamroth earned her doctorate at the Technical University of Braunschweig in 1994. Her dissertation, Ramsey-Zahlen für Mengen von Graphen (Ramsey numbers for sets of graphs) was supervised by Ingrid Mengersen. She completed her habilitation in 2002 at the University of Kaiserslautern, and took a faculty position at the University of Erlangen-Nuremberg. In 2008, she moved to her present position at the University of Wuppertal.

Books
Klamroth is a coauthor of a bilingual textbook, Lineare und Netzwerk-Optimierung/Linear and network optimization (with Horst Hamacher, Vieweg, 2000) and the author of the monograph Single-facility location problems with barriers (Springer, 2002).

Recognition
In 2019, the International Society on Multiple Criteria Decision Making gave Klamroth their Georg Cantor Award, in recognition of her contributions to the theory and methodology of multiple criteria decision making.

References

External links

1968 births
Living people
German computer scientists
20th-century German mathematicians
German women computer scientists
German women mathematicians
Technical University of Braunschweig alumni
Academic staff of the University of Erlangen-Nuremberg
Academic staff of the University of Wuppertal
21st-century German mathematicians
20th-century German women
21st-century German women